Canadian Bacon is a 1995 comedy film written, produced, and directed by Michael Moore which satirizes Canada–United States relations along the Canada–United States border. The film stars an ensemble cast featuring John Candy (in his final film role), Alan Alda, Bill Nunn, Kevin J. O'Connor, Rhea Perlman, Kevin Pollak, G. D. Spradlin, and Rip Torn.

The film was screened in the Un Certain Regard section at the 1995 Cannes Film Festival, and was the final film released starring John Candy, though it was shot before the earlier-released Wagons East. It is also Moore's only non-documentary film to date.

Plot 
In Niagara Falls, New York, thousands of former employees are outraged with military businessman R. J. Hacker, who had closed down his weapons manufacturing plant, Hacker Dynamics. At a conference held at the former plant, he pins the blame for the shutdown of his business on the President of the United States, who has just arrived. The president defends his own belief that the future of the children is more important than war, which has caused major decline in his approval rating. After the conference, he expresses to confidantes General Dick Panzer and National Security Advisor Stuart Smiley, revealed to have ties with Hacker, his discontent about not having an enemy to engage in war. An attempted negotiation with Russian President Vladimir Kruschkin to start a new cold war with Russia fails, and the president's suggestion of a war on international terrorism is deemed too absurd.

Serendipitously, American sheriff Bud Boomer offensively criticizes Canadian beer while attending a hockey game between the neighboring nations in Niagara Falls, Ontario. The ensuing brawl ends up on the news and catches Stuart's attention; Stuart, in turn, collects more information about Canada from a CIA agent named Gus, and suggests Canada as their new enemy during a cabinet meeting. Before long, television channels are littered with anti-Canada propaganda, which Boomer believes wholeheartedly. He prepares for war by distributing guns to his fellow sheriffs, including his girlfriend Honey and their friends Roy Boy and Kabral Jabar. He also helps form a local militia. After they apprehend a group of Americans "dressed as Canadians" attempting to destroy a hydroelectric plant, despite Gus's protests that they are just Americans, they sneak across the border to litter on Canadian lands, which leads to Honey being arrested by the Royal Canadian Mounted Police. In a rescue attempt, Boomer, Roy Boy and Kabral sneak into a Canadian power plant and cause a countrywide blackout. When the president learns of this, Stuart orders the Omega Force to remove Boomer from Canada before it is too late.

Hacker, seeking revenge on the President for shutting down his business, uses a software program ("Hacker Hellstorm") to activate missile silos across the country. The President learns that the signal causing the activation of the silos originated from Canada, and summons Hacker. Hacker offers to sell a program to the President that can cancel out the Hellstorm—for $1 trillion. Stuart, fed up with the President being too busy to give Hacker the money, realizes that Hacker, getting up to leave, is the one controlling the silos, not Canada, and, after storming up, takes the operating codes from him required to stop the Hellstorm (accidentally killing Hacker in the process). The President orders Stuart's arrest, despite his protests that he is now able to give the codes to the President so they could deactivate the missiles which are aimed at Moscow. As the launch time approaches the President pleads with Canadian Prime Minister Clark MacDonald over the phone to stop the launch.

Meanwhile, Honey was taken to a hospital upon her capture and escaped all the way to the CN Tower. She discovers the central computer for the Hellstorm and destroys it with a machine gun, aborting the launch sequence. She then reunites with Boomer, and they return to the United States on a speedboat.

An epilogue reveals the characters' fates: Boomer realizes his dream of appearing on Cops; Honey is named "Humanitarian of the Year" by the National Rifle Association; the president was defeated in the next election by a large landslide and now hosts Get Up, Cleveland; Stuart served eight months in prison, but was pardoned by the new president Oliver North; Panzer committed suicide after learning that Hogan's Heroes was fictional; Gus was last spotted heading to Mexico in a tank; Hacker's body has been viewed daily at Republican National Headquarters; Kabral has become a hockey star, winning the Hart Memorial Trophy three years in a row; Roy Boy's whereabouts become unknown; and MacDonald is "still ruling with an iron fist".

Cast

Production
Moore was inspired by the pro-war sentiment and 90% approval rating for President George H. W. Bush at the time of the Gulf War and wondered if the president could gain public support for war on any country, even Canada.

The film was shot in fall 1993, in Toronto, Hamilton, and Niagara Falls, Ontario; and Buffalo and Niagara Falls, New York.  Scenes depicting the rapids of the Niagara River were actually filmed at Twelve Mile Creek in St. Catharines.  Parkwood Estate in Oshawa was the site for the White House, and Dofasco in Hamilton was the site for Hacker Dynamics.  The scene where the American characters look longingly home at the US across the putative Niagara River is them looking across Burlington Bay at Stelco steelworks in Hamilton, Ontario.

The hockey game and riot were shot at the Niagara Falls Memorial Arena in Niagara Falls, Ontario, and the actors portraying the police officers (who eventually join in the riot upon hearing "Canadian beer sucks") are wearing authentic Niagara Regional Police uniforms.

The film has numerous cameos by Canadian actors, including Dan Aykroyd, who appears uncredited as an Ontario Provincial Police officer who pulls Candy over (not for the crude anti-Canadian graffiti on his truck, but its lack of a French translation; Boomer dutifully sprays his truck in French graffiti). Moore himself appears as an American gun nut. Cameo pictures of Canadian-American American actors in Propaganda are Michael J. Fox; Lorne Greene and Alex Trebek.

Reception
Canadian Bacon was panned by critics. On Rotten Tomatoes the film has an approval rating of 12% based on reviews from 17 critics.

The AV Club's Nathan Rabin in a 2009 review concluded, "After generating solid laughs during its first hour, Canadian Bacon falls apart in its third act," lamenting the film "was perceived as too lowbrow for the highbrows, and too highbrow for the lowbrows."

See also

 Canada–United States relations
 The Canadian Conspiracy, a 1985 mockumentary about how Canadian entertainers are conquering TV and movies in the United States.
  Dr. Strangelove or: How I Learned to Stop Worrying and Love the Bomb, a 1964 Stanley Kubrick comedy about a fictional escalation of tensions in the Cold War
 The Mouse That Roared
 South Park: Bigger, Longer & Uncut, the 1999 South Park animated film in which the U.S. declares war on Canada 
 "A Speculative Fiction", a song by Canadian band Propagandhi that explores a war between Canada and the U.S.
 Wag the Dog, a 1997 film about a war devised for propaganda reasons
 The real-life War of 1812 between the United States and British North America (now Canada).  This war was started when Great Britain started interfering with trade between the United States and France.
 War Plan Red, also known as the Atlantic Strategic War Plan, was a plan for the United States to make war with Great Britain, by attacking Canada.
 The real-life French and Indian War between Great Britain and France which also involved the colonies (then part of British North America) and New France which is now Canada.

References

External links
 
 
 

1995 films
1990s political comedy films
American political satire films
Canadian political satire films
1990s English-language films
English-language Canadian films
Films scored by Elmer Bernstein
Films about fictional presidents of the United States
Films directed by Michael Moore
Films about Canada–United States relations
Films shot in Hamilton, Ontario
Films shot in Toronto
American political comedy films
Films set in Toronto
Films set in New York (state)
Films set in Washington, D.C.
Gramercy Pictures films
Films produced by David Brown
PolyGram Filmed Entertainment films
1995 comedy films
1990s American films
1990s Canadian films